Teerayoot Suebsil is a professional footballer from Thailand. He currently plays for Bangkok United in the Thailand Premier League.

He also played for Bangkok University FC in the 2007 AFC Champions League group stage.

See also
Football in Thailand
List of football clubs in Thailand

References

Living people
Teerayoot Suebsil
1978 births
Association football midfielders
Teerayoot Suebsil
Teerayoot Suebsil